William Ramsay (1852–1916) was a Scottish chemist who discovered the noble gases.

William Ramsay may also refer to:
William Ramsay (astrologer) (fl. 1660), English physician and astrologer
William Maule, 1st Baron Panmure (1771–1852), Scottish peer (until 1782 named the Hon. William Ramsay)
Bill Ramsay (born 1929), American jazz saxophonist and band leader based in Seattle
Bill Ramsay (politician) (born 1962), politician in Newfoundland, Canada
Bill Ramsay (athlete) (1928–1988), Australian athlete
William Ramsay (classical scholar) (1806–1865), professor of humanity in the University of Glasgow 1831–63
William Ramsay Ramsay (1809–1850), Scottish MP for Midlothian and Stirlingshire
William Mitchell Ramsay (1851–1939), Scottish archaeologist and New Testament scholar
William Ramsay (manufacturer) (1868–1914), Australian manufacturer who invented Kiwi shoe polish
William Ramsay, 1st Earl of Dalhousie (died 1672), Scottish nobleman, army officer and politician
William Norman Ramsay (1782–1815), Scottish cavalry officer in the British Army, killed in action at Waterloo
William Ramsay (Royal Navy officer) (1796–1871), Scottish admiral in the Royal Navy

See also 
Sir William Ramsay School, school in Hazlemere, Buckinghamshire, named after the chemist
William Ramsey (disambiguation)
Wilhelm Ramsay, geologist

Ramsay, William